Shumei Yu (born October 20, 1977 in Dalian) is a Chinese former cross-country skier and biathlete. She competed in the 1998 Winter Olympics and 2002 Winter Olympics.

References 

1977 births
Living people
Chinese female biathletes
Chinese female cross-country skiers
Olympic biathletes of China
Biathletes at the 1998 Winter Olympics
Biathletes at the 2002 Winter Olympics
Biathlon World Championships medalists
Asian Games medalists in biathlon
Asian Games medalists in cross-country skiing
Cross-country skiers at the 1996 Asian Winter Games
Biathletes at the 1996 Asian Winter Games
Biathletes at the 1999 Asian Winter Games
Biathletes at the 2003 Asian Winter Games
Medalists at the 1996 Asian Winter Games
Medalists at the 1999 Asian Winter Games
Medalists at the 2003 Asian Winter Games
Asian Games gold medalists for China
Asian Games silver medalists for China
Asian Games bronze medalists for China
Sportspeople from Dalian
Sport shooters from Liaoning
Skiers from Liaoning